The Yili is a small horse from the north-western Xinjiang region of China.

Characteristics 
They are compact in conformation with a light head and straight profile. The withers are well pronounced and the back is short and strong, though the loin is long. The legs are clean. Yili horses are normally bay, chestnut, black or gray and are an average height of 14 hands high.

Breed history 
Yili horses originated around 1900 from Russian breeds crossed with Mongolian stock. Don, and Don-Thoroughbred crosses as well as Orlov Trotters were used from 1936 on to improve the native horses. In 1963 the decision was made to aim for a draft-type horse.

Uses 
Yili horses are used for riding and driving, and also bred for their meat and milk.

References

Horse breeds originating in China
Horse breeds